Statistics of Czechoslovak First League in the 1991–92 season. Peter Dubovský was the league's top scorer with 27 goals.

Overview
It was contested by 16 teams, and ŠK Slovan Bratislava won the championship.

Stadia and locations

League standings

Results

Top goalscorers

References

Czechoslovakia - List of final tables (RSSSF)

Czechoslovak First League seasons
Czech
1991–92 in Czechoslovak football